Igor Nikolayevich Yerokhin or Erokhin (4 September 1985 in Saransk) is a Russian former race walker. He was a participant of the 2012 Summer Olympics in London and finished in 5th place in the 50 kilometres walk. In 2011, he placed second at the European Race Walking Cup.

Career 
Yerokhin competed at the 2008 Summer Olympics in Beijing but tested positive for prohibited substances and was subsequently disqualified for two years.

In August 2013 the Russian Athletics Federation announced that Yerokhin had received a further ban after abnormal hematological profile indicators were found on his biological passport. He received a life ban and was stripped of all his results since 25 February 2011. This included his 5th-place finish at the 2012 Summer Olympics and his 2nd place at the European Race Walking Cup.

See also
List of doping cases in athletics

References

External links

Living people
1985 births
People from Saransk
Sportspeople from Mordovia
Russian male racewalkers
Olympic male racewalkers
Olympic athletes of Russia
Athletes (track and field) at the 2012 Summer Olympics
World Athletics Championships athletes for Russia
Russian Athletics Championships winners
Doping cases in athletics
Russian sportspeople in doping cases